Our Time Will Come  is a 2017 war film directed by Ann Hui, starring Zhou Xun, Eddie Peng and Wallace Huo. It revolves around the resistance movement during the Japanese occupation of Hong Kong. The film opened in China on July 1, 2017 to commemorate and to coincide with the 20th anniversary of the handover of Hong Kong from the United Kingdom to China. It was released in Hong Kong on July 6, and in the United States and Canada on July 7.

Synopsis
Set in the 1940s, the film tells the story of a legendary woman "Fang Gu" (Zhou Xun), who is one of the key figures during the Japanese occupation of Hong Kong. It also portrays the fight and struggle for freedom and independence by youths of the resistance groups. The story is narrated by an old taxi driver, being interviewed for a documentary, who speaks of the people he knew as a boy growing up under the Japanese occupation.

Fang Lan is an ordinary bookish young woman with a poetical streak who lives with her mother in 1942 Hong Kong. She is engaged to marry Lee Gam-wing (Wallace Huo), but breaks the engagement, citing his lack of concern about the fact that much of the population of Hong Kong is starving to death. Fang's mother rents rooms in her house to various intellectuals such as the writer Mao Dun. Learning that the Japanese are planning to execute much of the Hong Kong intelligentsia, the resistance is planning to smuggle the targeted intellectuals out to "Free China". Fang assists the resistance leader Blackie Lau (Eddie Peng) in helping Mao and his wife escape Hong Kong and in disposing of the corpse of the collaboratist spy Lau executed. Lee goes to the work for the poetry-loving Colonel Yamaguchi of the Kempeitai, the much feared Japanese military police. Despite his friendship with Yamaguchi who loves Tang poetry (a subject that Lee is an expert in) Lee sometimes assists the resistance.

Over the vehement opposition of her mother, Fang joins the resistance and becomes by 1944 the leader of its East Hong Kong section. Mrs. Fang wants her daughter to settle down as a wife and mother, roles that she rejects. Over time, Fang's mother comes to accept her as she is. Lau emerges as the most daring resistance leader in Hong Kong who constantly eludes the Kempeitai and its Chinese collaborators. A sort of love triangle emerges as Fang still has feelings for Lee while feeling attracted to Lau.

To assist Fang, her mother smuggles an important message, but is arrested by the Kempeitai. Fang and Lau lead an attack on the Kempeitai station to free her mother, which fails and Mrs. Fang is executed. Yamaguchi discovers that Lee was working for the resistance and tipped off Fang as to where her mother was being held. Yamaguchi has Lee killed. As Hong Kong has become too dangerous, Lau and Fang flee via junk at night; their ultimate fates are not revealed. A shot of Hong Kong at night in 1944 transforms into a shot of modern Hong Kong today. The elderly taxi driver who has been narrating the story of Fang breaks off his interview and goes back to his work as a humble taxi driver.

Cast

Zhou Xun as Fang Lan/"Fang Gu"
Eddie Peng as Liu Heizai/"Blackie" Lau
Wallace Huo as Li Jinrong/"Wing"
Paw Hee-ching as Mrs. Fang
Jessie Li 
Tony Leung as Ben
Guo Tao as Mao Dun
Huang Zhizhong
Jiang Wenli 
Alex Fong
Ivana Wong
Ray Lui 
Deanie Ip
Sam Lee
Eddie Cheung
Stanley Fung 
Kingdom Yuen
Suzuka Morita

Release
Our Time Will Come premiered on June 21, 2017 at the 2017 Shanghai International Film Festival. The film was originally announced during the 2017 Cannes Film Festival in May as the Shanghai festival's opening film, but its opening spot was replaced on June 9 by The Chinese Widow, directed by Bille August. Although no reason has been given by the festival, Clarence Tsui writing for the South China Morning Post assumed that this less to do with the content of Ann Hui's film and more to do with August's film, also set during World War II, being "an even better fit for China’s national narrative right now", having an acclaimed Danish director directing a romantic story between a local woman in the Zhejiang province and a US fighter pilot and being the first film completed after the signing of China and Denmark's co-production treaty on May 3.

Our Time Will Come was released in China on July 1, 2017 to coincide with the 20th anniversary of the handover of Hong Kong from the United Kingdom to China. The film was released on July 6, 2017 in Hong Kong.

The film was released in the United States and Canada by China Lion on July 7, 2017.

Reception

Critical response
Our Time Will Come has received positive reviews from critics. On Rotten Tomatoes, the film has a rating of 94%, based on reviews from 17 critics, with an average rating of 7.4/10. On Metacritic, the film has a score of 82 out of 100, based on 8 critics, indicating "Generally favorable reviews". 
The film was especially well reviewed in China, receiving a 83.6 points out of 100 in a report jointly released by China Film Archive and the entertainment researcher Entgroup.

Box office
The film has grossed 63 million yuan in China, surpassing the gross of Hui's 2014 film The Golden Era.

Awards and nominations

References

External links
 
 
 

2017 films
Chinese war drama films
Chinese action films
Films directed by Ann Hui
Hong Kong New Wave films
Hong Kong action films
Chinese war films
Hong Kong war drama films
2017 war drama films
2010s action war films
Films set in the 1940s
Second Sino-Japanese War films
Polybona Films films
2010s Cantonese-language films
2010s Hong Kong films